Francesco Veau (1727–1768) was an Italian painter of the Baroque period. He was a painter of quadratura and was born at Pavia.

References

1727 births
1768 deaths
Artists from Pavia
18th-century Italian painters
Italian male painters
Quadratura painters
18th-century Italian male artists